Monoclona rufilatera is a species of fungus gnats in the family Mycetophilidae.

References

Mycetophilidae
Articles created by Qbugbot
Insects described in 1837